From 1902 to the modern day, Cadillac, a division of General Motors, has introduced many models with differing engines to establish itself as the premier luxury car in the United States.

Current

Former Cadillac vehicles 

Notes

Brands

1900s 
1902-1903 Cadillac Runabout and Tonneau — 72 in wheelbase single-cylinder engine
1903-1904 Cadillac Model A — 72 in wheelbase single-cylinder engine
1904 Cadillac Models A and B
Model A — 72 in wheelbase single-cylinder engine
Model B — 76 in wheelbase single-cylinder engine
1905 Cadillac Models B, C, D, E, and F
Model B — 76 in wheelbase single-cylinder engine
Model C — 72 in wheelbase single-cylinder engine
Model D — 100 in wheelbase four-cylinder engine
Model E — 74 in wheelbase single-cylinder engine
Model F — 76 in wheelbase single-cylinder engine
1906 Cadillac Models H, K, L, and M
Model H — 102 in wheelbase four-cylinder engine
Model K — 74 in wheelbase single-cylinder engine
Model L — 110 in wheelbase four-cylinder engine
Model M — 76 in wheelbase single-cylinder engine
1907 Cadillac Models G, H, K, and M
Model G — 100 in wheelbase four-cylinder engine
Model H — 102 in wheelbase four-cylinder engine
Model K — 74 in wheelbase single-cylinder engine
Model M — 76 in wheelbase single-cylinder engine
1908 Cadillac Models G, H, M, S and T
Model G — 100 in wheelbase four-cylinder engine
Model H — 102 in wheelbase four-cylinder engine
Model M — 76 in wheelbase single-cylinder engine
Model S — 82 in wheelbase single-cylinder engine
Model T — 82 in wheelbase single-cylinder engine
1909-1911 Cadillac Model Thirty
1909 — 106 in wheelbase four-cylinder engine

1910s 
1910 — 110 in wheelbase; 120 in wheelbase (limousine) four-cylinder engine Fisher
1911 — 116 in wheelbase four-cylinder engine Fisher
1912 — Cadillac Model 1912; 116 in wheelbase four-cylinder engine Fisher
1913 — Cadillac Model 1913; 120 in wheelbase four-cylinder engine Fisher
1914 — Cadillac Model 1914; 120 and 134 in wheelbase four-cylinder engine Fisher
1915 — Cadillac Type 51; 122  and 145 in wheelbase V8 Fisher
1916 — Cadillac Type 53; 122  132  and 145 in wheelbase V8 Fisher
1917 — Cadillac Type 55; 125  and 145 in wheelbase V8 Fisher
1918-1919 Cadillac Type 57; 125  132  and 145 in wheelbase V8 Fisher

1920s 
1920-1921 Cadillac Type 59; 122  and 132 in wheelbase V8 Fisher
1922-1923 Cadillac Type 61; 132 in wheelbase V8 Fisher
1924 — Cadillac Type V-63; 132  and 145 in wheelbase V8 Fisher
1925 — Cadillac Type V-63; 132  138  and 145 in wheelbase V8 Fisher Fleetwood
1926-1927 Cadillac Series 314; 132  138  and 150 in wheelbase V8 Fisher Fleetwood
1928 — Cadillac Series 341-A; 140  and 152 in wheelbase V8 Fisher Fleetwood
1929 — Cadillac Series 341-B; 140  and 152 in wheelbase V8 Fisher Fleetwood

1930s 
1930 Cadillac Series 353, 370 and 452 Fisher Fleetwood
Series 353 — 140  and 152 in wheelbase V8 Fisher Fleetwood
Series 370 — 140  143  and 152 in wheelbase V12 Fisher Fleetwood
Series 452 — 148 in wheelbase V16 Fisher Fleetwood
1931 Cadillac Series 355, 370-A and 452-A Fisher Fleetwood 
Series 355 — 134  and 152 in wheelbase V8 Fleetwood
Series 370-A — 140  143  and 152 in wheelbase V12 Fleetwood
Series 452-A — 148 in wheelbase V16 Fisher Fleetwood
1932 Cadillac Series 355-B, 370-B and 452-B Fisher Fleetwood
Series 355-B — 134  and 156 in wheelbase V8 Fisher Fleetwood
Series 370-B — 140  and 156 in wheelbase V12 Fisher Fleetwood
Series 452-B — 143 and 149 in wheelbase V16 Fisher Fleetwood
1933 Cadillac Series 355-C, 370-C and 452-C Fisher Fleetwood 
Series 355-C — 140  and 156 in wheelbase V8
Series 370-C — 134  140  and 156 in wheelbase V12
Series 452-C — 143  and 149 in wheelbase V16
1934 Cadillac Series 10, 20, 30 and 452-D Fisher Fleetwood 
Series 10 — 128 in wheelbase V8
Series 20 — 136 in wheelbase V8
Series 30 — 146 in wheelbase V8
Series 355-D
Series 370-D — 146 in wheelbase V12
Series 452-D — 154 in wheelbase V16
1935 Cadillac Series 10, 20, 30 and 452-D Fisher Fleetwood 
Series 10 — 128 in wheelbase V8
Series 20 — 136 in wheelbase V8
Series 30 — 146 in wheelbase V8
Series 370-D — 146 and 160 in wheelbase V12
Series 452-D or 60 — 154 in wheelbase V16
1936 Cadillac Series 36–60, 36–70, 36–75, 36–80, 36–85, 36-90 Fisher Fleetwood 
Series 36-60 — 121 in wheelbase V8
Series 36-70 — 131 in wheelbase V8
Series 36-75 — 138 in wheelbase V8
Series 36-80 — 131 and 160 in wheelbase V12
Series 36-85 — 138 in wheelbase V12
Series 36-90 — 154 in wheelbase V16
1937 Cadillac Series 36–60, 37–65, 37–70, 37–75, 37–85, 37-90 Fisher Fleetwood 
Series 37-60 — 124  and 160.75 in wheelbase V8
Series 37-65 — 131 in wheelbase V8
Series 37-70 — 131 in wheelbase V8
Series 37-75 — 138  and 156 in wheelbase V8
Series 37-85 — 138 in wheelbase V12
Series 37-90 — 154 in wheelbase V16
1938 Cadillac Series 38–60, 38-60S, 38–65, 38–75, 38-90 Fisher Fleetwood 
Series 38-60 — 124  and 160 in wheelbase V8
Series 38-60S — 127 in wheelbase V8
Series 38-65 — 132  in wheelbase V8
Series 38-75 — 141  and 160 in wheelbase V8
Series 38-90 — 141 in wheelbase V16
1939 Cadillac Series 39-60S, 39–65, 39–75, 39-90 Fisher Fleetwood 
Series 39-60S — 127 in wheelbase V8
Series 39-61 — 126  and 162_ in wheelbase V8
Series 39-75 — 141  and 161_ in wheelbase V8
Series 39-90 — 141 in wheelbase V16

1940s 
1940 Cadillac Series 40-60S, 40–62, 40–72, 40–75, 40-90 Fisher Fleetwood 
Series 40-60S — 127 in wheelbase V8
Series 40-62 — 129 in wheelbase V8
Series 40-72 — 138  and 165_ in wheelbase V8
Series 40-75 — 141  and 161_ in wheelbase V8
Series 40-90 — 141 in wheelbase V16
1941 Cadillac Series 41-60S, 41–61, 41–62, 41–63, 41–67, 41-75 Fisher Fleetwood 
Series 41-60S — 126 in wheelbase V8
Series 41-61 — 126 in wheelbase V8
Series 41-62 — 126  and 163 in wheelbase V8
Series 41-63 — 126 in wheelbase V8
Series 41-67 — 139 in wheelbase V8
Series 41-75 — 136  and 163 in wheelbase V8
1942 Cadillac Series 42-60S, 42–61, 42–62, 42–63, 42–67, 42-75 Fisher Fleetwood 
Series 42-60S Fleetwood — 133 in wheelbase V8
Series 42-61 — 126 in wheelbase V8
Series 42-62 — 129 in wheelbase V8
Series 42-63 — 126 in wheelbase V8
Series 42-67 — 139 in wheelbase V8
Series 42-75 — 136  and 163 in wheelbase V8
1946 Cadillac Series 60S, 61, 62, 75 Fisher Fleetwood 
Series 60S Fleetwood — 133 in wheelbase V8
Series 61 — 126 in wheelbase V8
Series 62 — 129 in wheelbase V8
Series 75 — 136 in wheelbase V8
1947 Cadillac Series 60S, 61, 62, 75 Fisher Fleetwood 
Series 60S Fleetwood — 133 in wheelbase V8
Series 61 — 126 in wheelbase V8
Series 62 — 129 in wheelbase V8
Series 75 — 138 in wheelbase V8
1948-1949 Cadillac Series 60S, 61, 62, 75 Fisher Fleetwood 
Series 60S Fleetwood — 133 in wheelbase V8
Series 61 — 126 in wheelbase V8
Series 62 — 126 in wheelbase V8
Series 75 — 136 in wheelbase V8

1950s 

1950-1951 Cadillac Series 60S, 61, 62, 75 Fisher Fleetwood
All models were equipped with the 331 cu. in. (5.4L) V8 
Series 60S Fleetwood — 130 in wheelbase 
Series 61 — 122 in wheelbase 
Series 62 — 126 in wheelbase 
Series 75 — 146.75 in wheelbase 
1952 Cadillac Series 60S, 62, 75 Fisher Fleetwood
All models were equipped with the 331 cu. in. (5.4L) V8
Series 60S Fleetwood — 130 in wheelbase 
Series 62 — 126 in wheelbase 
Series 75 — 147 in wheelbase 
1953 Cadillac Series 60S, 62, 75 Fisher Fleetwood
All models were equipped with the 331 cu. in. (5.4L) V8
Series 60S Fleetwood — 130 in wheelbase 
Series 62 — 126 in wheelbase 
Series 62 Eldorado — 126 in wheelbase 
Introduced as a limited edition late in the production year only in a convertible 
Series 75 — 146.75 in wheelbase 
1954-1955 Cadillac Series 60S, 62, 75 Fisher Fleetwood
All models were equipped with the 331 cu. in. (5.4L) V8
Series 60S Fleetwood — 133 in wheelbase 
Series 62 — 129 in wheelbase 
Eldorado — 129 in wheelbase
After production of the '53 Series 62 Eldorado, the Eldorado was branded on its own. It was a convertible similar to the Series 62 convertible, but was much more. 
Series 75 — 149.8 in wheelbase 
1956 Cadillac Series 60S, 62, 75 Fisher Fleetwood
All models were equipped with the 365 cu. in. (6.0L) V8
Series 60S Fleetwood — 133 in wheelbase 
Series 62 — 129 in wheelbase 
Eldorado — 129 in wheelbase
First year to offer both convertible and hardtop (Coupe Seville) 
Series 75 — 149.75 in wheelbase 
1957 Cadillac Series 60S, 62, 70, 75 Fisher Fleetwood
All models were equipped with the 365 cu. in. (6.0L) V8
Series 60S Fleetwood — 133 in wheelbase 
Series 62 — 129.5 in wheelbase 
Eldorado — 129.5 in wheelbase
Offered 4 door Sedan Seville option 
Series 70 Eldorado Brougham — 126 in wheelbase
Series 75 — 149.7 in wheelbase 
1958 Cadillac Series 60S, 62, 70, 75 Fisher Fleetwood
All models were equipped with the 365 cu. in. (6.0L) V8
Series 60S Fleetwood — 133 in wheelbase 
Series 62 — 129.5 in wheelbase 
Eldorado — 129.5 in wheelbase
4 door option replaced with Special Coupe by special order only in limited quantities 
Series 70 Eldorado Brougham — 126 in wheelbase
Series 75 — 149.7 in wheelbase 
1959-1960 Cadillac Series 60S, 62, 63, 64, 69, 75 Fisher Fleetwood
All models were equipped with the 390 cu. in. (6.4L) V8
Series 60S Fleetwood — 130 in wheelbase 
Series 6200 — 130 in wheelbase
replaced previous Series 62 
Series 6300 — 130 in wheelbase "De Ville" sub-series
Series 6400 — 130 in wheelbase "Eldorado" sub-series
Series 6900 — 130 in wheelbase "Eldorado Brougham"
Series 6700 — 149.75 in wheelbase "Fleetwood 75"

1960s 
1961-1964 Cadillac Series 60S, 62, 75 Fisher Fleetwood
Series 60S Fleetwood — 129.5 in wheelbase V8
Series 62 — 129.5 in wheelbase V8
Series 75 — 149.8 in wheelbase V8
1965-1966 Cadillac Calais, De Ville, and Fleetwood Fisher Fleetwood
Calais — 129.5 in wheelbase V8
DeVille/Coupe de Ville — 129.5 in wheelbase V8
Fleetwood — 133  149.8  and 156 in wheelbase V8
1967-1970 Cadillac Calais, De Ville, and Fleetwood Fisher Fleetwood
Calais — 129.5 in wheelbase V8
DeVille/Coupe de Ville — 129.5 in wheelbase V8
Fleetwood — 120  133  149.8  and 156 in wheelbase V8

1970s
1970-1973 Cadillac Calais, De Ville, and Fleetwood Fisher Fleetwood
Calais — 130 in wheelbase V8
DeVille/Coupe de Ville — 130 in wheelbase V8
Fleetwood — 126.3  133  151.5   and 157.5 in wheelbase V8
1974 — Cadillac Calais, De Ville, and Fleetwood Fisher Fleetwood
Calais — 130 in wheelbase V8
DeVille/Coupe de Ville — 130 in wheelbase V8
Fleetwood — 126  133  151.5   and 157.5 in wheelbase V8
1975 — Cadillac Calais, De Ville, Seville, and Fleetwood Fisher Fleetwood
Calais — 130 in wheelbase V8
DeVille/Coupe de Ville — 130 in wheelbase V8
Seville — 114.3 in wheelbase V8
Fleetwood — 126.3  133  151.5 and 157.5 in wheelbase V8
1976 — Cadillac Calais, De Ville, Seville, and Fleetwood Fisher Fleetwood
Calais — 130 in wheelbase V8
DeVille/Coupe de Ville — 130 in wheelbase V8
Seville — 114.3 in wheelbase V8
Fleetwood — 126.3  133  151.5 and 157.5 in wheelbase V8
1977-1979
Coupe de Ville — wheelbase, V8
Sedan de Ville — wheelbase, V8
Fleetwood Brougham — wheelbase, V8
1971-1978
Eldorado — wheelbase, V8
1979-1985
Eldorado — wheelbase, V6 or V8

1980s 
1980-1985 
Seville —  wheelbase, V8
1982-1988 
Cimarron—  wheelbase, V6
1980-1984 
Coupe de Ville - wheelbase, V8
Sedan de Ville - wheelbase, V8
1985–1988
Coupe de Ville — wheelbase, V8
Sedan de Ville — wheelbase, V8
Fleetwood — wheelbase, V8
Fleetwood 75 — wheelbase, V8
1987-1988
Fleetwood Sixty Special — wheelbase, V8
1979-1985
Eldorado — wheelbase, V6 or V8
1986-1991
Eldorado — wheelbase, V6 or V8
1987–1993
Allanté — wheelbase, V8
1989–1993
Coupe de Ville — wheelbase, V8
Sedan de Ville — wheelbase, V8
Fleetwood — wheelbase, V8
1980-1986
Fleetwood Brougham - wheelbase, V8
1987-1989
Brougham - wheelbase, V8

1990s 
1992-2002
Eldorado — wheelbase, V8
1989-1993
Coupe DeVille - wheelbase, V8
1989-1993
Sedan DeVille - wheelbase, V8
1992-1997
Seville - wheelbase, V8
1994–1999
DeVille — wheelbase, V8
1997–2001
Catera — wheelbase, V6
1989-1992
Fleetwood - wheelbase, V8
1990-1992
Brougham - wheelbase, V8
1993-1996
Fleetwood - wheelbase, V8
1993
Sixty Special - wheelbase, V8
1998-2000
Escalade
1998-2004
Seville - wheelbase, V8

2000s 
2000-2005 DeVille - wheelbase, V8
2002-2006 Escalade
2002-2006 Escalade
2003-2006 Escalade ESV
2003-2007 CTS
2003-2013 CTS
2004-2014 CTS-V Sedan
2004-2009 SRX
2004-2009 XLR
2004-2009 XLR
2006-2009 XLR-V
2005-2010 BLS (not sold in the United States)
2005-2011 STS
2005-2011 STS - wheelbase
2005-2009 STS-V - wheelbase
2006-2011 DTS - wheelbase, V8
2007-2014 Escalade
2007-2014 Escalade
2007-2014 Escalade ESV
2009-2013 Escalade Hybrid hybrid SUV
2002-2013 Escalade EXT pickup truck

2010s 
2010-2016 SRX
2010-2019 CTS
2010-2013 CTS Sport Wagon
2011-2014 CTS Coupe
2011-2014 CTS-V Sport Wagon
2011-2015 CTS-V Coupe
2014-2019 CTS Sedan
2016-2019 CTS-V Sedan
2013-2019 ATS
2013-2018 ATS Sedan
2016-2018 ATS-V Sedan
2015-2019 ATS Coupe
2016-2019 ATS-V Coupe
2013-2019 XTS
2014 and 2016 ELR plug-in hybrid coupe
2015-2020 Escalade
2015-2020 Escalade
2015-2020 Escalade ESV

2020s 
2016–2020 CT6
2016–2020 CT6
2019–2020 CT6-V
2017–present XT5
2019–present XT4
2020–present CT4 
2020–present CT4
2020–present CT4-V
2020–present CT5
2020–present CT5
2020–present CT5-V
2020–present XT6
2021–present Cadillac Escalade
2021–present Escalade
2021–present Escalade ESV

Concepts and prototypes 

 Caribbean
 Coupe de Ville – 1949
 El Rancho – 1949
 Embassy — 1949
 Debutante — 1950
 Custom roadster for Bill Boyer — 1951-52 
 Eldorado and Townsman — 1952
 Le Mans – 1953
 Orleans — 1953
 El Camino — 1954 
 La Espada – 1954
 Park Avenue – 1954
 PF 200 Cabriolet – 1954
 Celebrity — 1955
 Eldorado Brougham — 1955
 La Salle II Roadster and Sedan — 1955
 Eldorado St. Moritz — 1955
 Westchester — 1955
 Castilian
 Gala — 1956
 Maharani — 1956
 Palomino — 1956
 Eldorado Brougham — 1956
 Director — 1957
 "Bubble-Top" parade car — 1957
 "Rain Car"  — 1958
 Eldorado Seville — 1958
 Skylight coupe/convertible — 1958
 Cyclone — 1959 [later rebodied]
 "Bubble-Top" parade car — 1959 
 Starlight — 1959
 4-door phaeton — 1960
 Eldorado — 1961
 XP-715 La Salle — 1961
 Florentine — 1964
 XP-840 Eldorado Fastback — 1965
 NART Zagato — 1970
 TAG Function Car — 1978 
 Cimarron PPG — 1985
 Voyage — 1988
 Solitaire — 1989
 Aurora — 1990
 LSE — 1994
 Evoq — 1999
 Steinmetz Catera — 1999
 Imaj — 2000
 Vizon — 2001
 Cien — 2002
 Sixteen — 2003
 BLS and Villa — 2005
 Provoq — 2008
 CTS Coupe — 2008
 Converj (PHEV) — 2009
 World Thorium Fuel (WTF) — 2009
 XTS Platinum — 2010
 Aera — 2010
 Urban Luxury Concept — 2010
 Ciel — 2011
 Elmiraj — 2013
 Escala — 2016
 Celestiq — 2020
 Lyriq — 2020
 InnerSpace – 2022

Notes

References